Vice-Admiral Sir Arthur Lumley St George Lyster,  (27 April 1888 – 4 August 1957) was a Royal Navy officer during the Second World War.

Naval career

After leaving Berkhamsted School, in 1902 Lyster joined HMS Britannia to train for a naval career.

Lyster was appointed a Naval Member of the Ordnance Committee in 1929 and given command of the cruiser  in 1932. He went on to command the 5th Destroyer Flotilla in 1933 and the Royal Navy Gunnery School at Chatham in 1935 before becoming director of training and staff duties at the Admiralty in 1936. He was given command of the aircraft carrier  in 1937 and was made Aide-de-camp to the King in 1939.

In the Second World War Lyster was initially rear-admiral in charge of HM Dockyard Scapa Flow and then from 1940 saw further active service as rear-admiral in charge of the Aircraft Carriers in the Mediterranean Fleet. He is notable for drawing up the attack plan for the Battle of Taranto, beginning in 1935 on the instructions of Admiral Sir Dudley Pound, and for putting it into execution in November 1940. His last appointment was as Flag Officer, Carrier Training, in 1943 before he retired in 1945.

Notes

External links
  HMS Speaker page which lists Lumley at Page 6
  Navy page on Battle of Taranto which lists him

Royal Navy vice admirals
Lords of the Admiralty
Royal Navy admirals of World War II
Commanders of the Royal Victorian Order
Knights Commander of the Order of the Bath
Commanders of the Order of the British Empire
Companions of the Distinguished Service Order
1888 births
1957 deaths
Admiralty personnel of World War II
People educated at Berkhamsted School
Military personnel from Warwickshire